Harold "Harry" Wyles (28 October 1922 – 1982) was an English footballer who played as a full back.

Wyles started his career with Leicester City. Without making a first team appearance, Wyles moved to Gateshead in March 1948. He scored a total of 7 goals in 251 appearances in league and cup competitions for Gateshead between 1948 and 1954.

Sources

1922 births
1982 deaths
English footballers
Association football defenders
Leicester City F.C. players
Gateshead F.C. players
English Football League players